Collective Brands, Inc. was an American holding company that owned Payless ShoeSource (footwear retailer), Robeez (shoe manufacturer) and Airwalk (shoe manufacturer). The company was purchased by Wolverine Worldwide, Blum Capital, and Golden Gate Capital in 2012.

History
Stride Rite Corporation purchased the Sperry Top-Sider and Keds brand names from Uniroyal in 1979. During 2005, Stride Rite completed its acquisition of Saucony. In 2006, Stride Rite purchased Robeez.

Payless purchased many of these companies during the 2000s, and on August 16, 2007, the company changed its name to Collective Brands, Inc.

On October 9, 2012, Collective Brands, Inc. announced its acquisition by Golden Gate Capital and Blum Capital was completed.  As a result, Payless ShoeSource and Collective Licensing International operate as a private, standalone entity known as Payless Holdings. As part of the transaction, Wolverine World Wide, a Michigan-based boot and shoe manufacturer, acquired Stride Rite Corporation including its Sperry Top-Sider, Keds, Saucony, and other brands from Collective Brands, Inc.

References

Shoe companies of the United States